Ego Likeness is an American darkwave/industrial rock band from Baltimore, Maryland. They were formed in 1999 by artist Steven Archer and writer Donna Lynch.

History

Early work
Ego Likeness began as an experimental and dark trip hop project. A demo called Songs from a Dead City, recorded on a four-track and self-produced by Archer and Lynch, was released in 1999.

In 2000, Archer and Lynch took the project in a darker electronic and dance direction, resulting in a self-released full-length album entitled Dragonfly under EL's own label, Angelfall.

Dancing Ferret Records
After a short hiatus from recording, a lengthy period of trial, error, revision, and many live performances, Ego Likeness signed with Dancing Ferret Discs for the 2004 release of Water to the Dead. This album featured the band’s electronic roots while exploring a bit of a heavier rock sound.

In 2005, Ego Likeness toured Germany, Luxembourg, and the continental US with Dancing Ferret label mates The Crüxshadows, as well as performing at several festivals on the east and west coast, including Convergence 11 (San Diego CA), Dracula’s Ball (Philadelphia PA), Blacksun Festival I (New Haven CT), Freaks United (DC), Eccentrik Festival I (Raleigh NC), Dragon Con (Atlanta GA), Ring Con (Fulda, Germany) and others.

Their first album, Dragonfly, was also re-released on Dancing Ferret Discs in 2005.

In 2006, Ego Likeness released their third full-length album, The Order of the Reptile, which ventured back into the realms of heavy electronica, a bit of trip hop, some goth rock, and darkwave.

2006 also saw the release of Where's Neil When You Need Him?, a tribute to writer Neil Gaiman, featuring the song "You Better Leave the Stars Alone", written for the book Stardust. The band toured Germany once again and the US with The Crüxshadows and Ayria throughout the winter of 2006–2007.

In 2007, Ego Likeness toured Germany, Poland and the UK with Ayria and Angelspit. They have also often performed at sci-fi/fantasy convention Dragon Con, where they are semi-regular guests along with a number of other dark alternative bands.

Ego Likeness also performs regularly at Wicked Faire in Somerset, New Jersey.

The Compass EPs
In 2007, Ego Likeness began self-releasing the first of four EPs, collectively titled The Compass. The first, South, featured new songs and old remixes.

2008 brought about the second of the Compass EPs, West, as well as their single, "The Lowest Place on Earth". This was supported by a US tour throughout late winter and spring.

In 2009, the North EP is released, featuring duet with The Dark Clan and a cover of PJ Harvey's "Down by the Water." Ego Likeness also embarked on a tour as a supporting act for Combichrist and Julien-K.

In 2012, the final EP in the Compass series, East, was released. The EP contained two original tracks, a cover of The Police's "Tea in the Sahara", and seven remixes from various artists including Angelspit and Komor Kommando.

Metropolis Records

2010s 
Ego Likeness were signed to Metropolis Records and released their fourth album, Breedless, on April 13, 2010. The album received critical acclaim from music magazines ReGen and Reflections of Darkness.

Ego Likeness has also contributed to multiple volumes of the cancer-benefit compilations, Electronic Saviors.

On August 14, 2012, the first single, "Treacherous Things" for the upcoming album "When the Wolves Return" was released along with a music video for the song directed by Kyle Cassidy.

On October 29, 2013, the group announced on their official Facebook page a Winter 2013 US headlining tour with support from Servitior.

In 2015, "When The Wolves Return" full-length album was released, along with a single featuring a dozen remixes of the album track "New Legion."

Additional background
Ego Likeness have also shared the stage with Voltaire, The Damned, Chris Connelly, Collide, Razed in Black, Bella Morte, Das Ich, Rasputina, The Start, Iris, Decoded Feedback, The Azoic, More Machine Than Man, In Strict Confidence, Combichrist, New Model Army, Attriton, The Last Dance, Peter Murphy, and many others.

Other projects
Lynch has written a dark fiction novel entitled Isabel Burning, released through Raw Dog Screaming Press in 2008. She has also released two collections of poetry, In My Mouth (2000), and Ladies and Other Vicious Creatures (RDSP, 2007). Her latest, a novella called Driving Through the Desert, was released on Thunderstorm Books in April 2012.

Archer has released a children's book entitled Luna Maris and a steampunk fable chapbook titled Red King Black Rook in 2008. He is an accomplished visual artist whose collage-based work has appeared in numerous galleries and in Weird Tales magazine. He periodically DJs at venues in Baltimore and DC, and occasionally performs with New York City's Terrorfakt. He is also the creator of the electronic/ noise project Hopeful Machines and continues to show art in various venues on the east coast. Additionally, Hopeful Machines was signed to Washington, DC-based label Radio-Active-Music in late 2008. Hopeful Machines' first hard copy album, ::Skinless::, was released in December 2008.

Steven Archer is also the creator of the solo project Stoneburner, which incorporates elements of experimental noise, industrial rock, ethereal, trip hop, and worldbeat. Stoneburner's output explores themes of neurodiversity as well as social issues such as abortion rights and anti-racism, and has included homages to media such as Donna Tartt's The Secret History and Peter Watts' Blindsight.

In 2021, Steven Archer was nominated and became a finalist for a Bram Stoker Award for his graphic novel adaptation of Edgar Allan Poe's Masque of the Red Death.

Archer and Lynch are also the creators of the experimental/instrumental/spoken word outfit The Trinity Project.

Personal lives
Steven Archer and Donna Lynch have both raised hairless sphynx cats. In addition, they are both ordained ministers of the Universal Life Church.

Donna Lynch has also been open about her struggles with mood disorders, fibromyalgia, and Lyme disease.

Steven Archer is openly on the autism spectrum, and has advocated for increased public understanding of both the creative potential of autistic individuals and the stigma autistic individuals face.

Members

Current
Steven Archer – lead guitar, programming, vocals, music, words
Donna Lynch – vocals, piano, words, music
Mindcage Rick – live drums, rhythm guitar
Mike K. Johnson – live drums

Past
Justin "Dingo" Sabe – keytar, synths, noise
Adam Goode –  bass
Tim McCracken –  keyboards
Dave O'Donnell –  drums
Jenny Mettee –  rhythm guitar, cello
Stephanie Kim –  violin
Jerome Lintz –  drums
Nick "Konchog Nyima" vonZoll – drums
Dan Mullin – rhythm guitar
Amanda Mason – keyboards, backing vocals
Shaun Mason – rhythm guitar
Magpie Killjoy – drums

Discography

Studio albums

EPs
South, 2007
West, 2008
North, 2009
East, 2012
Compass, 2016

Singles
"The Lowest Place on Earth" 2008
"Treacherous Thing" 2012
"New Legion" 2015

Remixes by Ego Likeness
"When I Cared" – The Perfects on the rerelease of the album Future Automatic
"Cassandra" – The Crüxshadows on the album Fortress in Flames
"Terribly When" – The Last Dance on the album Reflections of Rage
"Tarnished" – Black Tape for a Blue Girl on the single "The Scarecrow"
"Inside of You, In Spite of You (Ti Bon Ange Mix)" – ThouShaltNot on the single "The Projectionist"
"Vena Cava"- Angelspit on the CD Krankhaus
"Demon"- Hypofixx on the album After December
"Mantra (Shades of Grey version)"- The Machine in the Garden on the album XV

Guest appearances
"Little Drummer Boy" – With Nicki Jaine on the CD Projekt Records' Holiday Single 1
Then and Again – Voltaire
 "The NeverEnding Story" – The Dark Clan on the Goths on a Boat EP.
 "Princess Chaos" – Angelspit on "Hideous and Perfect"
 "The World Below" – Aioboforcen on Dedale
Raised By Bats – Voltaire

Compilation appearances
Asleep By Dawn Magazine Presents: DJ Ferret's Underground Club Mix #1
The Best of Radio Free Abattoir
Dancing In The Dark: 10 Years Of Dancing Ferret
Dancing In The Dark: 2006
Where's Neil When You Need Him? 2006
Electronic Saviors: Industrial Music To Cure Cancer
Electronic Saviors: Industrial Music to Cure Cancer Vol. 2
"Gothic Spirits 12"

References

External links
 Official website
 Ego Likeness Live Journal
 Hopeful Machines: Steven Archer's Atmospheric Electronica side project

1999 establishments in Maryland
Dependent Records artists
Electronic music duos
American industrial rock musical groups
Metropolis Records artists
Music based on Dune (franchise)
Musical groups established in 1999
Musical groups from Maryland
Musical quartets